Roderick McKenzie (1852 – 9 October 1934) was a New Zealand Member of Parliament for Buller and Motueka, in the South Island. He was a member of the Liberal Party.

Biography

Early life and career
He was born in Ross-shire, Scotland in 1852. He was educated at the Glasgow Academy and became a builder by trade. He then began two years of employment with the London and Glasgow Engineering and Ironship Building Company before deciding to move to Canada. He did not reside there long before emigrating to New Zealand in 1869. He sailed on the ship City of Dunedin and after arriving in Otago he became a miner.

McKenzie left his mining job in Otago to move to the West Coast and enter the construction industry as an engineer and bridge builder. He was involved in building infrastructure in the area. His projects included construction of the Westport Staiths at a cost of 22,000 pounds, the railway bridge at Arahura, laying rails to Hokitika and years later the Jervois Quay wharf in Wellington.

He became involved in community affairs on the West Coast. He was elected a member of the Westport Harbour Board, Nelson Harbour Board and Kumara Hospital Board.

Member of Parliament

He was a "strong supporter of the Seddon administration". In Parliament he helped to pass a Loan Bill which allowed the Westport Harbour Board to borrow £50,000 in order to fund extensive and long overdue improvements. In July 1905 a group of "country" Liberal members formed a ginger group and proclaimed their intention to advocate country interests in the Government caucus. MacKenzie was one of the group's members and was elected as their leader. He was Chairman of Committees from 1906 to 1908.

He was Minister of Public Works, Minister of Customs and Minister of Mines from 1909 to 1912 under Sir Joseph Ward. The practical experience he had as an engineer and builder made him an effective minister as the period featured great activity in public works schemes, particularly in roading improvements. However, in 1912 McKenzie would have nothing to do with Thomas Mackenzie's (no relation) Liberal Ministry stating that: John Millar should have been Prime Minister, Mackenzie's ministers were political novices and had forsaken their liberal principles.

In 1932, when he was 80 years old, McKenzie contested the Motueka seat once again at the by-election following the death of George Black. Standing as an Independent Liberal–Labour candidate he placed third out of three candidates.

Later life and death
Following his exit from Parliament, McKenzie resumed his career as an engineer and contractor in Wellington. He was also a prominent member of the West Coast Association.

McKenzie died on 9 October 1934 in Wellington aged 82.

Notes

References

External links

The Hon Roddy Nugget

|-

1852 births
1934 deaths
New Zealand Liberal Party MPs
Independent MPs of New Zealand
Members of the Cabinet of New Zealand
Local politicians in New Zealand
Businesspeople in construction
New Zealand people of Scottish descent
People from the West Coast, New Zealand
People from Motueka
Members of the New Zealand House of Representatives
New Zealand MPs for South Island electorates
Unsuccessful candidates in the 1914 New Zealand general election
19th-century New Zealand politicians
19th-century New Zealand engineers
20th-century New Zealand engineers